Guo Xiang (born 252  AD –  died 312 AD) is credited with the first and most important revision of the text known as the Zhuangzi which, along with the Tao Te Ching, forms the textual and philosophical basis of the Taoist school of thought. He was also a scholar of xuanxue.

Zhuangzi
The Guo Xiang redaction of Zhuangzi revised a fifty-two chapter original by removing material he thought was superstitious and generally not of philosophical interest to his literati sensibilities, resulting in a thirty-three chapter total. He appended a philosophical commentary to the text that became famous, and within four centuries his shorter and snappier expurgated recension became the only one known.

This Zhuangzi recension is traditionally divided into three sections: ‘Inner Chapters’ (1-7), ‘Outer Chapters’ (8-22), ‘Miscellaneous Chapters’ (23-33). This division is quite old and is likely to have been part of the original recension.

Guo's redaction focuses on his understanding of Zhuangzi's philosophy of spontaneity (literally "self so"). This practiced spontaneity is demonstrated by the story of Cook Ding, rendered as Cook Ting in the Burton Watson translation (which is itself ultimately derived from the Guo Xiang recension):

Here, the careful yet effortlessly spontaneous way in which Cook Ding is described cutting up the ox is both an example of the cognitive state of mind Zhuangzi associated with the Tao and the assertion that this state is accessible in everyday life.

In popular culture 
In 1990, a computer-generated image of Guo Xiang's head was used as the logo for the Russian television production company, VID. In 2017, the old logo was heavily redesigned.

See also 
Xiang Xiu
Chan
Chinese philosophy
Laozi
Zhuangzi (book)
Xuanxue
VIDgital

References

External links 
 Complete Works Of Chuang Tzu, translated by Burton Watson
 Stanford Encyclopedia of Philosophy entry on Zhuangzi
 A sculpture of Xiang's head

Jin dynasty (266–420) philosophers
Jin dynasty (266–420) Taoists
3rd-century births
4th-century Chinese philosophers
312 deaths
Xuanxue
3rd-century Chinese philosophers